Hans Herbert Ulrich (1886–1971) was a German film producer.

Selected filmography
 Pillars of Society (1935)
 The Hour of Temptation (1936)
 A Strange Guest (1936)
 Militiaman Bruggler (1936)
 The Hunter of Fall (1936)
 Carousel (1937)
 A Girl from the Chorus (1937)
The Chief Witness (1937)
 The Mystery of Betty Bonn (1938)
 Triad (1938)
 Between the Parents (1938)
 Storms in May (1938)
 A Rare Lover (1950)

References

Bibliography 
Giesen, Rolf. ''Nazi Propaganda Films: A History and Filmography. McFarland & Co, 2003.

External links 
 

1886 births
1971 deaths
People from Świebodzice
People from the Province of Silesia
German film producers